Nicole White is a Canadian activist. White is an advocate for Indigenous people, an anti-poverty activist and notable as the first openly out provincial political candidate in Saskatchewan history.

In 2004, White and Julie (now Jai) Richards spearheaded the case to legalize same sex marriage for the province of Saskatchewan. White and Richards were featured in a documentary short entitled Ready to Be Married.

Career
White has worked in a variety of community development roles including serving as the executive director of AIDS Saskatoon, financial literacy coordinator with READ Saskatoon, and as director of the USSU Pride Centre.

Politics
In the 2011 provincial election, White ran as a candidate for the Saskatchewan New Democratic Party in Saskatoon Northwest, placing second behind Gordon Wyant. White is the NDP candidate for Saskatoon Meewasin in the 2016 provincial election.

Awards

White has received a number of awards for her advocacy and work in the community.

 Recipient of the 2004 YWCA Women of Distinction Award – Young Woman to Watch
 Recipient of the 2005 Government of Saskatchewan Centennial Medal
 Recipient of the 2006 Avenue Community Centre-Community Service Award
 Recipient of the 2007 University of Saskatchewan Doug Wilson Award-for outstanding campus advocacy
 2009-Athena Nominee of the Women's and Business Professionals Award
 2010-nominated for the G8 Oxfam-Bringing Women to the Table, Oxfam Saskatoon

References

Living people
Year of birth missing (living people)